Marcelo Golm (born 15 September 1992) is a Brazilian mixed martial artist who competes in the Heavyweight division of the Bellator MMA. He has also competed in the Ultimate Fighting Championship (UFC). As of February 28, 2023, he is #5 in the Bellator Heavyweight Rankings.

Mixed martial arts career

Early career

Starting his career in 2015, Golm acquired a 5–0 record fighting around regional Brazilian promotions, winning all the fights by knockout.

Ultimate Fighting Championship
Golm made his UFC debut against Christian Colombo on 28 October 2017, at UFC Fight Night: Brunson vs. Machida. He won the fight via submission in the first round.

Golm faced Timothy Johnson on 3 February 2018, at UFC Fight Night 125. He lost the fight via unanimous decision.

For his third fight with the promotion, Golm faced Arjan Bhullar on 27 October 2018, at UFC Fight Night 138. He lost the fight via unanimous decision. After the fight, Golm became a free agent and eventually re-signed with the UFC.

Golm faced Sergei Pavlovich on 20 April 2019, at UFC Fight Night: Overeem vs. Oleinik. He lost the fight via first-round knockout.

After losing three fights in a row, Golm was released from the UFC.

Post-UFC career
After his release, Golm signed with Taura MMA. In his promotional debut he faced DJ Linderman at Taura MMA 11 on 30 October 2020. Golm won the fight via first-round technical knockout.

Golm then faced Brandon Hebert at XMMA 1 on 30 January 2021. He won the fight via second-round submission.

Bellator MMA
Golm signed to a multi-fight deal with Bellator MMA.

Golm was expected to make his promotional debut against Linton Vassell on 16 July 2021, at Bellator 262. On 12 July, the bout was scratched after Vassell suffered an injury.

Golm was scheduled to face Steve Mowry on 13 August 2021, at Bellator 264. However, on 4 August, it was announced that Mowry was scratched from the bout, with Golm rescheduled to face Kelvin Tiller on 20 August at Bellator 265. The week of the event, Tiller pulled out of the bout and was replaced by promotional newcomer Billy Swanson. Golm won the fight via technical knockout in round one.

Golm faced Davion Franklin on July 22, 2022 at Bellator 283. He won the bout via rear-naked choke at the end of the third round.

Golm is scheduled to face Daniel James on March 31, 2023 at Bellator 293.

Mixed martial arts record

|-
|Win
|align=center|10–3
|Davion Franklin
|Submission (rear-naked choke)
|Bellator 283
|
|align=center|3
|align=center|4:36
|Tacoma, Washington, United States
|
|-
|Win
|align=center|9–3
|Billy Swanson
|TKO (punches)
|Bellator 265
|
|align=center|1
|align=center|4:57
|Sioux Falls, South Dakota, United States
|
|-
|Win
|align=center|8–3
|Brandon Hebert
|Submission (arm-triangle choke)
|XMMA: Vick vs Fialho
|
|align=center|2
|align=center|1:17
|Palm Beach, Florida, United States
|
|-
|Win
|align=center|7–3
|DJ Linderman
|TKO (punch)
|Taura MMA 11
|
|align=center|1
|align=center|1:59
|Kissimmee, Florida, United States
|
|-
|Loss
|align=center|6–3
|Sergei Pavlovich
|KO (punch)
|UFC Fight Night: Overeem vs. Oleinik
|
|align=center|1
|align=center|1:06
|St. Petersburg, Russia
|
|-
|Loss
|align=center|6–2
|Arjan Bhullar
|Decision (unanimous)
|UFC Fight Night: Volkan vs. Smith
|
|align=center|3
|align=center|5:00
|Moncton, New Brunswick, Canada
|
|-
|Loss
|align=center| 6–1
|Timothy Johnson
|Decision (unanimous)
|UFC Fight Night: Machida vs. Anders
|
|align=center|3
|align=center|5:00
|Belém, Brazil
|
|-
|Win
|align=center|6–0
|Christian Colombo
|Submission (rear-naked choke)
|UFC Fight Night: Brunson vs. Machida
|
|align=center|1
|align=center|0:47
|São Paulo, Brazil
|
|-
|Win
|align=center|5–0
|Nicolas Oliveira
|TKO
|Demolidor Fight MMA 10
|
|align=center|1
|align=center|0:18
|Bauru, Brazil
|
|-
|Win
|align=center|4–0
|Italo Marques
|KO (punches)
|Mr. Cage 28
|
|align=center|1
|align=center|1:02
|Manaus, Brazil
|
|-
|Win
|align=center|3–0
|Marcio Pinheiro dos Santos
|KO (punch)
|Ichiban Kombat Championship
|
|align=center|1
|align=center|2:04
|Guarulhos, Brazil
|
|-
|Win
|align=center|2–0
|Danilo Espera
|TKO (punches)
|Thunder Fight 4
|
|align=center|2
|align=center|0:05
|São Paulo, Brazil
|
|-
|Win
|align=center|1–0
|Jhonny Pereira
|TKO (punches)
|Aspera FC 18
|
|align=center|1
|align=center|4:33
|São Paulo, Brazil
|

See also 
 List of current Bellator fighters
 List of male mixed martial artists

References

External links 
 
 

1992 births
Living people
Brazilian male mixed martial artists
Heavyweight mixed martial artists
Bellator male fighters
Ultimate Fighting Championship male fighters
Sportspeople from Santos, São Paulo